Bronchospasm or a bronchial spasm is a sudden constriction of the muscles in the walls of the bronchioles. It is caused by the release (degranulation) of substances from mast cells or basophils under the influence of anaphylatoxins. It causes difficulty in breathing which ranges from mild to severe.

Bronchospasms occur in asthma, chronic bronchitis and anaphylaxis.  Bronchospasms are a possible side effect of some drugs: pilocarpine, beta blockers (used to treat hypertension), a paradoxical result of using LABA drugs (to treat COPD), and other drugs.  Bronchospasms can present as a sign of giardiasis.

Some factors that contribute to bronchospasm include consuming certain foods, taking certain medicines, allergic responses to insects, and fluctuating hormone levels, particularly in women.
Bronchospasms are one of several conditions associated with cold housing.

The overactivity of the bronchioles' muscle is a result of exposure to a stimulus which under normal circumstances would cause little or no response. The resulting constriction and inflammation causes a narrowing of the airways and an increase in mucus production; this reduces the amount of oxygen that is available to the individual causing breathlessness, coughing and hypoxia.

Bronchospasms are a serious potential complication of placing a breathing tube during general anesthesia. When the airways spasm or constrict in response to the irritating stimulus of the breathing tube, it is difficult to maintain the airway and the patient can become apneic. During general anesthesia, signs of bronchospasm include wheezing, high peak inspiratory pressures, increased intrinsic PEEP, decreased expiratory tidal volumes, and an upsloping capnograph (obstructive pattern).  In severe cases, there may be complete inability to ventilate and loss of ETCO2 as well as hypoxia and desaturation.

Cause
Bronchospasms can occur for a number of reasons. Lower respiratory tract conditions such as asthma, chronic obstructive pulmonary disease (COPD), and emphysema can result in contraction of the airways. Other causes are side effects of topical decongestants such as oxymetazoline and phenylephrine. Both of these medications activate alpha-1 adrenergic receptors that result in smooth muscle constriction. Non-selective beta blockers are known to facilitate bronchospasm as well. Beta blockers bind into the β2 receptors and block the action of epinephrine and norepinephrine from binding to its receptors, causing shortness of breath.

Additionally, the pediatric population is more susceptible to disease and complications from bronchospasm due to their airway diameter being smaller; applying Poiseuille's Law to the airways it is clear that airflow resistance through a tube is inversely related to the radius of the tube to the fourth power, therefore, decreases in airway results in significant flow impediments.

Diagnosis
Signs and symptoms:
 Wheezing
 Diminished breath sounds
 Prolonged expiration
 Increase airway pressures (in ventilated patients)

Treatment

Beta 2 agonists

Beta2-adrenergic agonists are recommended for bronchospasm.
 Short acting (SABA)
 Terbutaline
 Salbutamol
 Levosalbutamol
 Long acting (LABA)
 Formoterol
 Salmeterol
 Others
 Epinephrine - titrate to effect (e.g. 10-50 mcg IV), especially in setting of hemodynamic compromise
 increasing anesthetic depth
 IV magnesium
 Increase FiO2 to 100% and consider manual ventilation

Muscarinic Acetylcholine receptor antagonist

The neurotransmitter acetylcholine is known to decrease sympathetic response by slowing the heart rate and constricting the smooth muscle tissue. Ongoing research and successful clinical trials have shown that agents such as diphenhydramine, atropine and Ipratropium bromide (all of which act as receptor antagonists of muscarinic acetylcholine receptors) are effective for treating asthma and COPD-related symptoms.

See also 
 Bronchoconstriction
 Bronchodilation
 Wheezing

References

External links 

Bronchus disorders
Asthma